The Steelpoort River, iNdubazi or Tubatse is a river in Limpopo Province, South Africa. It flows northeastwards and is a right hand tributary of the Olifants River, joining it at the lower end of its basin. Its source is located at Kwaggaskop, a farm between Dullstroom, Stoffberg and Belfast.

The main tributaries of the Steelpoort River are the Klip River, Dwars River, Waterval River and the Spekboom River. The De Hoop Dam on the Steelpoort River will be in operation from late 2014.

Some stretches of this river are popular spots for kayaking.

Sekhukhuneland, the historical area of the Pedi people, is located between the Steelpoort River and the Olifants River.

See also
 List of rivers of South Africa

References

External links
The Olifants River Basin, South Africa
Greater Tubatse municipality
The Olifants River System
Steelpoort River - News - EngineeringNews
Hydro-Institutional Mapping in the Steelpoort River Basin, South Africa
The Olifants River

Olifants River (Limpopo)
Rivers of Limpopo